Millburn may refer to:

Places

United Kingdom
Millburn, Inverness, an area of Inverness, Scotland
Millburn, County Londonderry, a townland in County Londonderry, Northern Ireland

United States
Millburn, Illinois, an unincorporated community in Illinois, United States
Millburn, New Jersey, a township in New Jersey, United States

Other
Millburn Academy, secondary school in Inverness
Millburn distillery, distillery in Inverness
Millburn High School, public high school in Millburn, New Jersey
Millburn Magic, women's soccer team in New Jersey
Millburn Park, Vale of Leven F.C. football ground
Millburn (NJT station), New Jersey Transit station in Millburn, New Jersey
Millburn Township Public Schools, school district in Millburn, New Jersey

See also
Milburn (disambiguation)